Louhossoa or Luhuso is a former railway station in Louhossoa, Nouvelle-Aquitaine, France. The station was opened in 1892 and is located on the Bayonne - Saint-Jean-Pied-de-Port railway line. The station was served by TER (local) services operated by the SNCF. It was closed in 2019.

References

Railway stations in France opened in 1892
Defunct railway stations in Pyrénées-Atlantiques